Bear Valley, California may refer to:
 Bear Valley, Alpine County, California, a census-designated place, the site of the Bear Valley Music Festival
Bear Valley (resort), Alpine County, a ski resort
 Bear Valley, Colusa County, California
 Bear Valley, Mariposa County, California, a census-designated place

See also
 Big Bear Valley, San Bernardino County, California